Lagoon is a privately owned amusement park in Farmington, Utah, United States, located about 18 miles north of Salt Lake City. It has ten roller coasters, five of which are unique; Colossus the Fire Dragon, the last Schwarzkopf Double Looping coaster still in operation in the United States (Laser at Dorney Park closed at the end of the 2008 season and was moved to Germany to become the Teststrecke traveling roller coaster in 2009); Roller Coaster, one of the oldest coasters in the world operating since 1921; Wicked, designed by Lagoon's engineering department and Werner Stengel in cooperation with ride manufacturer Zierer; BomBora, a family coaster designed in-house; and Cannibal, built in-house with one of the world's steepest drops.

Lagoon is divided into five main areas: The Midway, containing the majority of the rides and an assortment of carnival type games and food outlets; Pioneer Village which has several exhibits displaying pioneer buildings and artifacts; Lagoon-A-Beach, a water park which is included in the regular admission price; Kiddie Land with several rides for small children, and the X-Venture Zone featuring more extreme rides that cost extra. Lagoon also offers a full-service RV park, a campground, and a shaded walking trail outside the park that stays open all year.

History

1886–1940
In 1886, the Denver & Rio Grande Western Railroad built a resort called Lake Park on the shores of the Great Salt Lake. It was one of several resorts built along the lake throughout the late 1800s. In the following years, however, the lake level receded drastically until Lake Park was far from the lake, and the park closed by the end of the 1895 season.

Simon Bamberger, who was building his Salt Lake & Ogden Railroad line from Salt Lake City to Ogden, Utah, was vice president of Lake Park and a 25% owner. To increase passenger traffic on his line, he bought most of the original Lake Park buildings from the D&RGW and moved them about 3 miles (5 km) east near Farmington, Utah. This gave the residents of Salt Lake City (and later, Ogden) a reason to travel over the "Bamberger". The resort was named Lagoon for the small body of water located on the original forty acres (162,000 m2).

Lagoon opened in Farmington, Utah, on July 12, 1896, and included "Bowling, Elegant Dancing Pavilion, Fine Music, A Shady Bowery and Good Restaurants." In 1900, guests began swimming and rowing boats in Lagoon Lake. Over time more rides were added, such as the authentic Herschell-Spillman Carousel and Cagney  miniature-gauge Miniature Railroad. In 1901, the park hosted a minor league baseball team in the Inter-Mountain League and in 1902, a team in the Utah State League.

One of the most popular rides today is Lagoon's famous wooden roller coaster. Designed by John Miller of Coney Island fame, it was constructed in 1921. Miller gave Lagoon's coaster plenty of dips and turns. The ride lasts just under two minutes and the coaster train reaches speeds up to 45 mph (72 km/h). It is locally known as the "White Roller Coaster" due to its white wash paint. As of 2022, however, none of the Roller Coaster is still white, since the wooden supports are regularly replaced and the new supports are left unpainted.

In 1927, a  swimming pool with "water fit to drink" was built north of Lagoon Lake. It was one of the first filtered swimming pools in western North America, and was a cleaner alternative than swimming in the briny Great Salt Lake.

Lagoon's popularity grew during the 1920s and 1930s. There was betting and horse racing there in the 1920s, but the Utah State Legislature put a stop to that only a few years after it began. The first Fun House was built in 1929, along with many other midway shows, rides, and games. During the "Big Band" era, Artie Shaw, Benny Goodman, Duke Ellington, Count Basie, and Glenn Miller played Lagoon's stage.

1940–1970

The park was closed for three seasons during World War II. By 1946, the park was in bad condition and on the brink of permanent closure. The Bamberger family considered razing it. However, Ranch S. Kimball and Robert E. Freed, seeing an excellent opportunity, convinced the Bamberger family to lease the park to their newly formed Utah Amusement Corporation. Kimball served as president while Freed served as Secretary and Assistant Manager. The Freed family's Lagoon Corporation later bought the resort outright from the Bamberger family in 1983.

When the Utah Amusement Corporation took over the lease of Lagoon, a Farmington town ordinance prohibited African-Americans from using the swimming pool and the ballroom. By the end of the 1940s, Robert Freed had fully opened Lagoon to the black community, and further extended this policy to the Terrace Ballroom (formerly the Rainbow Gardens) in Salt Lake City.

The Freed family made several improvements, including the installation of new dressing rooms and a general overhaul of the swimming pool in 1949, a rebuilt fun house and the introduction of the "Dodgem Cars" and the "Lakeshore Express" miniature diesel train in 1951, and a new Ferris wheel in 1953.

In November 1953, a fire damaged much of the park, including the fun house, dance pavilion, and the front portion of the roller coaster. It was quickly rebuilt to open for the next season and began to surpass the popularity of its main rival, Saltair. Many rides were restored, rebuilt, or replaced, and a few new rides were added. In 1956, Mother Gooseland, Lagoon's first themed area, was opened between the Midway and the swimming pool. It featured rides only for children.

From the mid-1950s into the 1960s Lagoon made many improvements. A showboat was added to the lake, and a new fun house was built, which featured such attractions as a multi-lane giant slide; mazes, mirrors, obstacle courses, and mystery rooms; a large turntable which flung its riders off at great velocity; revolving barrels; and the ubiquitous jets of air – activated by a human operator – which startled those who were unfortunate enough to stand over them. There was also a mini-car ride added in 1960, followed by the "Space Scrambler", spook house, I.Q. Zoo, and shooting gallery in 1961. The first Wild Mouse ride came in 1965.

On the Midway, musical groups including the Beach Boys, the Rolling Stones, the Kingston Trio, and Johnny Cash drew the crowds to the bandstand. The Beach Boys made mention of the park in the song "Salt Lake City" on their 1965 album Summer Days (And Summer Nights!!).  The Rolling Stones concert at Lagoon was in July 1966.

The  narrow-gauge Animaland Train began circling Lagoon Lake in 1967. In 1975, authentic Crown Metal Products-built 4-4-0 steam locomotives were put into operation around the lake and the name was changed to the Wild Kingdom Train.

1970–1997
The turn-of-the-century-style Opera House Square opened in 1968 and showcased melodramas, musicals, and silent movies. In 1976, Lagoon expanded east by purchasing Pioneer Village, an old west town complete with several historic structures that had been collected and exhibited in Salt Lake City's Sugar House area since 1953. The buildings were moved to Lagoon and the  narrow-gauge "Pioneer Village Railroad" (featuring "Old Ironsides," a Crown Metal Products 4-4-0 locomotive) circled the town. There was also the "Lagoon Miniature Railroad," which looped around the residential area of Pioneer Village using the original miniature -gauge steam locomotive acquired in the early 1900s. A log flume ride was brought in from the defunct Pixieland Park in Oregon.

One of today's most popular rides was added in 1976, the Jet Star 2. Before Lagoon purchased the Jet Star 2, it was one of the attractions at Spokane, Washington's Expo '74.

Colossus the Fire Dragon came to Lagoon in 1983, to huge crowds and great reviews as it was selected by People magazine in 1984 as one of the top 10 coaster rides in the country. With its double inverted loops, Colossus had the most inversions of any coaster at Lagoon for 32 years. Cannibal, built in 2015, currently has four inversions, the most for a roller coaster at Lagoon.

In the late 1980s, both the famous old fun house and the "Haunted Shack", a walk-through freaky fright attraction, were closed, victims of escalating maintenance costs, safety concerns, and increased risk of litigation. The famous swimming pool closed after its fifth decade in 1987. This made way for the $5.5 million Lagoon-A-Beach water park, which was completed in 1989. Its construction spelled the end of the small-scale railroad operations in Pioneer Village, as some of the supports stood in the way of the track.

1997–present
 In 1997, in a major expansion of Pioneer Village, Lagoon added Rattlesnake Rapids, a river rapid ride located in the new Rattlesnake Plaza which included a new game – Rising Waters, manufactured by Bobs Space Racers. Also added was a new food stand, Rattlesnake Grub, and a new merchandise location, Pedlers Place, that sells candy, toys, Lagoon merchandise, colored rocks, and Rattlesnake Parafinia, but also sells ponchos for the wet ride ahead.
 In 1998, Lagoon added Wild Mouse, a Maurer Sohne wild mouse coaster. This ride type was not new to Lagoon, which had had a wooden model that was demolished 5 years prior to the current steel model's opening.
 In 1999, Lagoon broke the  mark when it built The Rocket, an S&S space shot tower with two different ride towers (out of three): Re-Entry and Blast-Off.
 In 2000, Samurai, a Mondial Top Scan, was built, as well as Double Thunder Raceway.
 In 2001, Lagoon built a Monidal Top Spin, Cliffhanger, on the south midway on the north side of Wild Mouse.
 In 2002, Lagoon expanded its X-Venture Zone by adding Catapult.
 In 2003, The Spider - Coaster, a Maurer Sohne SC 2000, opened on the south midway across from Colossus the Fire Dragon.
 In 2004, Lagoon revamped their children's area, Kiddieland, giving it a garden theme and adding two new rides to the area, Kontiki and Dragon Fly.
 In 2005, The Bat, an inverted coaster, was constructed near Lagoon-A-Beach manufactured by Vekoma. It is a family-friendly coaster with a minimum height requirement of 42".
 In 2006, Lagoon expanded Kiddieland further by adding two new rides, Dinosaur Drop and Lady Bug Bop, Zierer Family Drop Towers.

 In 2007, Lagoon built a $10 million roller coaster named Wicked, a Zierer tower launch coaster. An Imelmann turn, a heart-line roll, two half-pipe turns, and the signature "lake turn" into a final tunnel before returning to the station. Wicked is located in the south midway section of the park, behind the "Fire Dragon". Wicked opened on June 1, 2007. In addition to Wicked, Lagoon made several improvements to the park. The area in front of Spider and Fire Dragon was expanded and repaved for Wicked, connecting the surrounding areas for the three coasters.
 In 2008, OdySea was built, a Zierer "Flying Fish" with aquatic themes. OdySea is an interactive ride with a joystick to control the vehicle's height. Arrows blink to direct the rider to dodge jets of water from the sea creatures that attempt to soak you as accompanying music tells a story. The ride features a giant squid centerpiece, with submarines and fish as cars each holding two passengers. OdySea opened on April 5, 2008, and started a continuing tradition of adding music to every new ride. Also in 2008, Lagoon expanded its employee kitchen with twice the seating and all new counters, serving areas, etc. Lagoon also introduced designated smoking areas known as "Sit and Smoke Stations", in response to a new Davis County law that went into effect on January 1, 2008, that prohibited smoking in privately and publicly owned outdoor places. The addition of these "Sit and Smoke Stations" caused the removal of one of Lagoon's X-Venture Zone attractions, Peak Exposure, a small rock climbing wall formerly located on the south midway by Roller Coaster.
 In 2009, Lagoon opened the "Jumping Dragon", a Zierer "Dragon Roundabout". Jumping Dragon has 20 gondolas (two are the tail and head) with two riders per gondola, each with their own lap bar making for a much more comfortable ride. Jumping Dragon features oriental themes including a  pagoda that the ride travels through and a baby dragon that the dragon of the ride has with the front gondola (added a few months later). Jumping Dragon is also one of six rides at Lagoon to have a soundtrack (along with OdySea, Musik Express, Turn of the Century, BomBora, and Ruka Safari). Jumping Dragon opened to the public on April 4, 2009.
 In 2010, Lagoon revamped their large Ferris wheel, Sky Scraper. It was taken down in October 2009 and was back with a new coat of paint in April 2010. As a result of the economic crisis, Lagoon did not install a new ride that season, ending their tradition of adding a new ride every year since 1994. Instead, the park improved their entertainment division with all new shows. One show was presented by Cirque Innosta, called L'Orage. Lagoon also installed a new game, "3 point challenge".
 In 2011, Lagoon installed another family roller coaster, named BomBora. BomBora was installed in the area formerly occupied by the Lagoon-A-Beach locker building and a pavilion, which were demolished in October 2009. Most of the lockers from that building were moved to an area formerly occupied by janitorial and utility miscellany. That in turn was moved to other locations around the water park. This year also marks when the Terroride mural was replaced with a talking vulture and a dark forest theme in the queue.
 In 2012, Lagoon installed Air Race in the concrete flat near Jet Star II. This replaced Psycho Dave's Junkyard that normally appears there during Frightmares, which did not return. Another Frightmares haunt, Deception, was replaced with Backlot.
 In 2013, Lagoon began work on a new coaster at the site of the former Top Eliminator. Two new family rides opened for the 2013 season, Tipsey Tea Cups and Red Rock Rally. Tipsey Tea Cups (Zamperla Midi Tea Cup) features a solid canopy over the ride with a unique chandelier inside. Red Rock Rally (Zamperla Speedway) features an extensive red stone backdrop for the ride. Every vehicle is named after trails only found in Moab, Utah, thus being themed as all-terrain vehicles. Both feature loading to the ground instead of an elevated platform. The opening of these rides also included new pathways with colored benches. Wild Mouse was re-painted to have a green track instead of the light purple paint it featured when first installed in 1998. Rock-O-Plane also got new paint to feature red and yellow spirals, and upgraded LED lighting was installed. For Frightmares this year, Lockdown was branded as Zombie's Lockdown.
 In 2014, Lagoon continues the extensive work on a new coaster, building vertically throughout the entire operating season. With much of its focus on the new coaster, no new rides were added this year. Cirque Innosta came back with another show, called Bosque. Many improvements were done throughout the park this season. Due to maintenance problems, Lagoon-A-Beach's old Rip-Curl slide was replaced with a new slide of the same name. A shooting game in Pioneer Village was also removed; the building now houses a retail shop featuring Lagoon-branded goods. A new animal exhibit which houses wild boars was added to Wild Kingdom Train. Another improvement was the addition of Dole Whip to the food line-up at Lagoon. At a press conference on September 4, Lagoon officially announced Cannibal, their new roller coaster for the 2015 season.
 In 2015, the new rollercoaster called Cannibal opens, featuring a  elevator lift hill, a 116° beyond vertical drop, three inversions, and a top speed of 70 mph. During what was to be a spring opening when announced in September 2014, Cannibal was still being constructed during the 2015 season which led to many complaints by guests about the delayed opening. Cannibal did however open on July 2 to rave reviews and a two-hour long line. The opening also introduced the new Cannibal Plaza, a fenced-off area separating Cannibal from surrounding rides and exits through Cannibal's Gift Shop that was not completed until 2016. Due to Cannibal, Skyscraper now features a different sign and queue with the exit being in the front instead of behind the ride as in the years prior. Lagoon also expanded its food line-up with the introduction of BeaverTails next to Terroride and Honolulu Hot Dogs, which was placed in a shack that is part of the new midway entering into Cannibal's queue.
 In 2016, Lagoon continued work on Cannibal with no new rides again this season, as well as the opening of Cannibal's Gift Shop, which offers an exit to the fenced-off Cannibal Plaza. The gift shop repurposed the old Pit Stop gift shop that was installed for the now removed Top Eliminator Dragsters. A new purchase stand for Double Thunder Raceway is now featured on the side of Cannibal's Gift Shop by the entrance of the ride. Extensive work was also done on Spider with new black and red paint and new wheel housing bogies for the cars. With the extensive work, the seats now spin freely at the top of the first drop, instead of the previous forward or backward first drop into a sharp curve which released the spinning seats. New wheel housing bogies were also installed on Wicked. Lagoon also re-introduced the Colossus sign on top of the first loop of Colossus: The Fire Dragon with red coloring for the letters. The sign was removed a few years prior.
 In 2017, a new mural commissioned by Sril Art (Shae Petersen of Salt Lake City) appeared on the wall above the entrance to Game Time. Two new rides are added to Kiddie Land, Flying Tigers, and Ruka Safari.
 In 2018, the ride "Centennial Screamer" was moved from the South Side of the park to the North Side very close to Cannibal. Its old location is now occupied by restroom facilities. The Roller Coaster was also re-tracked and opened later that season. 
In 2019, A restaurant area called "Biergarten" was introduced which has two restaurants and a bar. 
In 2020, the game "Soccer Darts"  was replaced with "Hang Time". It is located between Teriyaki Stix and Biergarten. A new kid's ride opened in Kiddieland called Engine 86 which is located near the Bat.
On December 18, 2021, a fire broke out early in the day at the Carousel Candy shop which sustained damage. The fire rekindled that evening and subsequently destroyed the candy shop and the adjacent Scamper, a miniature bumper cars ride. A rebuilding procedure has begun and Lagoon is still set to open on the normal date for the 2022 season.

Attractions

Roller coasters
Lagoon features ten different roller coasters. The oldest, Roller Coaster (often called White Roller Coaster by locals), was built in 1921 and is an American Coaster Enthusiasts Roller Coaster Landmark.

Thrill rides

Dark rides

Water rides

Family rides

Children rides

X-Venture Zone
In 1995, the Skycoaster towers were set up on the North Midway and marked the beginning of what would become the X-Venture Zone. (The sky coaster was previously owned by Midway West and traveled in carnivals.)  Later the Top Eliminator, Double Thunder Raceway, and The Catapult would all become part of the X-Venture Zone. These rides are not included in Lagoon's all-day Passport and require an extra fee to ride.
 Skycoaster: Lagoon's Skycoaster opened during the 1995 season. Lagoon was one of the first amusement parks in the United States to add the Skycoaster to its collection of rides. This was also the first of the five rides that would be included in the X-Venture Zone.

 Top Eliminator: In 1996 Lagoon added Top Eliminator to the park. Riders get to simulate a drag race down a four lane race track complete with "Christmas tree" countdown lights. The ride cost $1.2 million and the opening was delayed by about 3 months due to software glitches. The attraction opened for the 1996 season at the end of August. Lagoon was the second amusement park to receive this ride. Kentucky Kingdom was the first. The attraction was removed in 2011; Cannibal was erected on the site.
 Double Thunder Raceway: Double Thunder Raceway, an elaborate go-cart ride, opened at the beginning of the 2000 season. Each track has 28 go-carts and features several sweeping turns, overpasses, 360-degree spirals, straight-aways, and camelbacks. At the time this attraction opened the go-cart drivers had to be at least 54" tall, Lagoon's highest restriction, and passengers had to be at least 46" tall. Guests must be at least 50" tall to drive, or 40" tall to ride only. The ride lasts for 5 minutes, and the go-carts are equipped with a remote-control safety system, ground-control speed devices, and traffic signal lights to indicate the status of the track.

 Catapult: The Catapult, the latest X-Venture Zone ride, was installed in 2002. It is powered by extension springs which exert a maximum pull of 80,000 pounds of force. A spokesperson for Lagoon said that this may be Lagoon's most thrilling ride ever, as there is a strong weightless feeling in the ride, some twists, and oscillations. The ride used to have a live video feed of the passengers, with the passengers able to purchase the recording. The camera and microphone have since been removed. Riders are strapped in a capsule seat by full harness restraints with redundant locking mechanisms for safety and comfort.

Events

Entertainment
Lagoon has offered varied entertainments to park visitors over the years, from live bands to musicals, and Wild West shows to Pop shows.

2017 - 2 shows
 Jungle Rhythm - A story told through song and dance about two explorers who follow a treasure map through the depths of the jungle. A stream of top hit songs and treasure map clues take these explorers on an exciting jungle adventure, where they meet many wild animals. With the help of these animals, they search for the hidden treasure.
 Verano - Lagoon is proud to present, in partnership with Joseph Wartnerchaney, Verano. Verano is a roller-coaster mix of styles that blends comedy, tap dancing, thrilling illusions, powerhouse vocals, breathtaking choreography & beautiful aerial dance. All linked by a hilarious narrative that ignites a succession of wacky adventures, set to the toe-tapping tunes of Postmodern Jukebox. This is not a musical, a variety show, or even vaudeville. It's Verano!

2016 - 2 shows
 Anyway You Want It - Lagoon is proud to present, in partnership with the creator and director of Cirque Innosta, Joseph Wartnerchaney, Any Way You Want It. In a time when denim was distressed, Aqua Net was king and rock was as big as the hair, a local skating rink is threatened by a corporate takeover. One intrepid team of ladies takes a stand and fights for their right to party by competing in a quirky 80's-themed talent show. This gutsy group of gals lets everyone know that there's only two things to be afraid of ... a pair of roller skates and girl power! Don't stop believing because the journey is any way you want it!
 Let's Dance - Lagoon is proud to present Let's Dance, directed by Kenneth Plain. Let's Dance will consist of incredible top 40 hits and a fun filled 90's throw back. Artists represented include Rachel Platten, Ariana Grande, Taylor Swift, Justin Bieber, DNCE and Nick Jonas. Let's Dance is filled with amazing hip hop and jazz dance that will light up the stage at the Carousel Theatre. So come on, Let's Dance!

2015 - 3 shows
 Live in Living Color - Carousel Theater. Featuring: Colton, Riley, Jason, Michael, Lindsay, Becca, Giovanna, and Mikki. Swings: Jared, Shelby, and Shawnee.
 Strawberry Fields/Night Show - Carousel Theater. Featuring: Nathan Waite, Kaylie Gustafson, Devyn Warburton, Angie Petty, Raven Flowers, and Matt Stott. Swings: Michael Hernandez, Shawnee Johnson, Colton Ward, Riley French, and Becca Lichfield. Featuring a live rock band: Chris Petty, Nick Petty, Jacob "Jabob" Ostler, Garret Rueckert, Jaxon Garrick, and Matt Wilson. Show created by: Joseph Wartnerchaney/Manhattan Creative Group.
 The Rainmaker - Traveling Show. Featuring: Scott Taylor. Swing: Quinn Kapetanov. Show created by: The Manhattan Creative Group.

2014 - 3 shows
 The Rock Show - Includes a live band performing the songs.
 Simple Joys
 Cirque Innosta Presents Bosque

2013 - 2 shows
 The Rock Show - Includes a live band performing the songs.
 Shubert Ally

2012 - 2 shows
 Marry the Night
 Shubert Ally

2011 - 3 shows
 The Great American Jukebox/pop show (played evenings during the summer)- featuring past and present pop, rock, and country hits - Carousel Theatre. Featuring: Lauren Piggott, Camry Madsen, Jeferrson Tuke, Mickelle Tuke, Loren Hawks, Michelle Robbins, Blake Murrey, and Jordan Robbins.
 Hollywood Sings (played daytimes during the summer) - Carousel Theatre
 Cirque Innosta - Brought back for Lagoon's Birthday Celebration

2010 - 4 shows
 The Great American Jukebox - Carousel Theater
 Broadway corner - Carousel Theater
 Cirque Innosta Presents L'Orage
 Extreme Parrots Show

2009 - 3 shows
 American 60's Jukebox - Game Time Theatre
 Broadway Corner - Carousel Theatre
 Rock U2 The Top - Carousel Theatre

2008 - 3 shows
 Country swing jubilee - Carousel Theater - Featuring: Amy Wilson, Dustin Bolt, Nathan Copier, Chris Squires, Vaden Thurgood, Ali Kaelin
 Rock u2 the top - Carousel Theater - Featuring: Mickelle Bean, Ashytn Nelson, Emily Giaque, Cory Alan Heaps, JT Seumalu, Vaden Thurgood. Swings: Ali Kaelin, Chris Squires
 Broadway Rhythm - Music USA Theater - Featuring: Bronwyn Tarboton, Lexi Giaque, Samantha Bird, Jazzie Welch, Nathan Copier, John Wolfe, David Holmes, Gray Aydelott. Swings: Amy Wilson, Nick Berg

2007 - 3 shows
 "Electric '80s" - Carousel theater, featuring: Dallin Allred, Michelle Robbins, Amanda Monson, Elise Groves, Parker Solum, William Richardson, Emily Giaque, Steve Shoemaker
 "Rock U2 the Top" - Carousel Theater, featuring: Gray Aydelott, Mickelle Bean, Daysha Hanneman, Blake Murray, Ashtyn      Nelson, JT Seumalu, Emily Giaque, Steve Shoemaker
 "On Broadway" - Music Theater, featuring: Nathan Copier, Cody Jensen, Andrew Lewis, Becca Schwartz, Jennifer Perucca, Kathryn Stratford, Kim Stephenson, Preston Yates, Valerie Larsen, Lexi Giaque, William Richardson

2006 - 3 shows
 Club-A-Go-Go featuring:  Gray Aydelott, Natassia Clark, James Hales, Daysha Hannemann, Jacob Knight, Andrew Lewis, Ashtyn Nelson and Mandy Stanford,  Kim Stephenson, Vaden Thurgood
 Rock U2 the Top featuring: Emily Giaque, Lexi Giaque, Daniel Hamblin, Michelle Hunt, Steve Shoemaker, Vaden Thrugood, Daysha Hannermann, Cody Jensen)
 Jukebox Jive featuring: Nick Berg, Collin Christensen, Nathan Copier, Heidi Evans, Elise Groves, Cody Jensen, Kristen Kemp, Ralynne Riggs, Linton Dean, Kim Stephenson

1990 Regular Season
"A Salute to Broadway" at the "Music USA Theater". Songs performed included "A Pretty Girl" from "The Ziegfeld Follies"; "They Call the Wind Mariah" from "Paint Your Wagon"; "Let Me Entertain You," from "Gypsy"; "Tonight" from "West Side Story" and "I Cain't Say No" from "Oklahoma".  Performers: Collette Schlappi, Angi Cannon, Camille Bailey, LauraLyn Oldham, Angela Burnett, Bret Wheadon, Jeff Whiting, Tim Shoemaker, Roger Stephenson, Brett Bradford.

Frightmares
Every autumn the park offers Halloween-themed shows and attractions from mid-September to the end of October, collectively known as Frightmares.

List of current attractions
 Frightening Frisco
 Nightmare Midway
 Fun House of Fear
 Malevolent Mansion
 Nightwalk
 Scary & Crow's Super Fun Straw Maze
 Spook-A-Boo Trick-or-Treat Trail
 Pioneer Village Scare Zone
 The Mariner (show)
 Hackenslash Chainsaw Demonstration team (show)
 Windy the Witch

The 2006 Frightmares season featured The Hackenslash Chainsaw Demonstration Team, Wailin' Witches, Zombie Mambo, and The "Hypnotysm".

Also in 2006 and 2007 Lagoon hosted the following walk-thru attractions: Haunted Hollywood, Fun House of Fear, Hal O. Ween High, Spook-A-Boo Walk-Thru, and Psycho Dave's Salvage Yard.

The 2007 Frightmares Season featured The Hackenslash Chainsaw Demonstration Team, Vampire Awakening, Monster Classics, and The Master Hypnotist.

The 2008 season lagoon removed the Haunted Hollywood attraction, but Deception was added in the 2009 season in its place.

The 2010 season featured new haunted house, Lockdown. Also went to Knowlton Elementary School to sign autographs.

The 2011 season featured Nightwalk.

The 2012 season Lagoon removed Psycho Dave's Salvage Yard and Deception, replacing them with Backlot, and a children's walk-through named Scary & Crow's Super Fun Straw Maze! Scary & Crow's is located in the main street of Pioneer Village.

The 2013 season only featured a re-branding of a haunt. Lockdown themed to a prison where prisoners are escaping the previous years, Lagoon decided to rename the haunt to Zombie's Lockdown, and gave it a theme of the government trying to control the zombie population, but the zombies want out.

Games
Lagoon has 26 Currently operating carnival games in which prizes ranging in size from small to giant can be won.

Lagoon's past games include a Fascination Parlor, Skee Ball, Dime Toss, and Skatterball/Monkey Ball. "Putter Around The Park," an 18-hole miniature golf course, with obstacles based on rides and attractions in the park, was removed to make way for Jumping Dragon in 2009.

Controversy
In 2012, Lagoon became the focus of animal welfare groups' protests which called for a boycott of the park, citing USDA inspection reports that suggested poor care of animals in the Wild Kingdom. The Utah Animal Rights Coalition and PETA pointed to a range of USDA citations over a 15-year span that included insufficient living space for and unexplained deaths of animals. While admitting to some problems, a Lagoon spokesman denied any abuse taking place and said veterinarians and staff regularly monitored the animals.

Movies and TV shows filmed at Lagoon
 Mirror, Mirror: You and Your Self Image is a 1969 film by the Church of Jesus Christ of Latter-day Saints and BYU. The opening scenes are filmed at Lagoon.
 Lagoon was one of many parks featured in the first roller coaster documentary, America Screams in 1978.
 An episode of the Werewolf TV series was filmed at Lagoon in fall 1987, featuring scenes in and around the Dracula's Castle attraction.
 Some scenes in the 1996 TV movie, Terror in the Family, were filmed at the Roller Coaster and Centennial Screamer.
 In My Sister's Shadow, a 1997 TV movie, featured a scene on the North Midway. Another scene was filmed at Saltair.
 The Luck of the Irish (2001) - A few scenes from this Disney Channel Original Movie were filmed at the North Midway area of Lagoon. The dance festival was held in front of the entrance to the Sky Scraper.
 Wieners (2008) A montage featuring scenes at an amusement park were mostly filmed at Lagoon in 2007. The name of the park was changed in the film.
 An episode of The Aquabats featured brief and edited glimpses of Lagoon.
 In 2015, Christmas Land was filmed in the Pioneer Village section of the park.
 Season 3, episode 12 of Andi Mack featured brief and edited glimpses of Lagoon; including Honolulu Hot Dogs, Slam Dunk, The Rocket, Paratrooper, Cannibal, and Sky Scraper.

Notable incidents
In 1989, six year old Ryan Beckstead was struck and killed on "Puff The Little Fire Dragon" after he fell off the ride and stood up in between the track. He had believed the ride was over after he fell, and proceeded to try to find his parents before getting hit on the head by the oncoming train.

On August 14, 2021, a 32-year-old man fell 50 feet after dangling from the park's Sky Ride, a chairlift-like ride which transports people from one end of the amusement park to the other. The man succumbed to his injuries in the hospital the next day.

Notable people who worked at Lagoon
 Atari founder Nolan Bushnell managed midway carnival games at Lagoon while earning his electrical engineering degree at the University of Utah.

Notes

External links

 Official Lagoon Park Website
 
 Lagoon History Project
 Lagoon Fans (fan site)

 
Buildings and structures in Farmington, Utah
Amusement parks in Utah
Tourist attractions in Davis County, Utah
Farmington, Utah
Companies based in Utah
1886 establishments in Utah Territory